Ginalloa is a genus of parasitic mistletoes found in southern and south-eastern Asia. The various species are found in the Andaman Islands and Sri Lanka, the Philippines, Malaysia, the island of Borneo, the island of Java and Papua province in Indonesia, Papua New Guinea, including the Bismarck Archipelago, Myanmar, Laos and Thailand. The genus belongs to the family Santalaceae (as this includes Viscaceae). Ginalloa arnottiana, described by Pieter Willem Korthals in 1839, is the type-species.

Selected species 

 list source :

References

External links
 Specimen detail for Ginalloa ovata from the New York Botanical Garden.   (Note: a link to a jpg image of the specimen can be found at the very bottom of the page)

Santalaceae
Parasitic plants
Santalales genera